L'Abergement-Clémenciat is a commune in the department of Ain and the region of Auvergne-Rhône-Alpes in eastern Metropolitan France. The commune was established in 1857 by combining the two parishes of Abergement and Clémenciat.

Geography
L'Abergement-Clémenciat lies on the border between Bresse and Dombes at an altitude of 206 to 272 meters. The commune sits on an area of 1,596 hectares. Other communes near-by include Châtillon-sur-Chalaronne, Illiat, Sulignat, Thoissey, Saint-Étienne-sur-Chalaronne, and Dompierre-sur-Chalaronne. The closest big cities are Lyon, and Geneva.

Hydrography
The Chalaronne flows west-northwest through the southern part of the commune.
The Glenne forms the northern border with the commune of Illiat. It empties into the Chalaronne at Saint-Étienne-sur-Chalaronne
The Vernisson Canal forms the eastern border with Châtillon-sur-Chalaronne and it empties into the Chalaronne at Pontpeillon.
The Payon Canal crosses the ash ponds at Châtillon.

Toponymy
There are 4 communes in Ain with "Abergement" in their name. The other three are Le Petit-Abergement, Le Grand-Abergement, and L'Abergement-de-Varey. It seems to designate agricultural concessions in the 11th-15th centuries.

History
It was once a large timber plantation.

Politics and administration

Since 2008, Daniel Boulon has been the mayor of L'Abergement-Clémenciat. He was re-elected in the 2020 municipal elections.

Population

Sights
 The Vieux Bourg (old town) has been classified as a monument historique by the French Ministry of Culture since November 18, 1994. All that remains of the castle is the ruins. The walls of the 14th century enceinte are visible.
 A château, built in 1700, rebuilt in the 19th century
 A church, consecrated in 1868, built under the direction of Louis-Auguste Boileau, an architect of Paris.

See also
 Communes of the Ain department

References

External links

 La Dombes and the town of L'Abergement-Clémenciat
 Gazetteer Entry
 LesCommunes.com

Communes of Ain
Ain communes articles needing translation from French Wikipedia